Raphitoma bracteata is a species of sea snail, a marine gastropod mollusk in the family Raphitomidae.

Description
The shell reaches a length of 13 mm, and a diameter of 6 mm.

The subfusiform, turreted, white shell has a pointed spire. It contains 6 whorls, of which only 1½ whorl in the protoconch. The subsequent whorls are convex with axial, close and elevated ribs and elevated, decurrent, parallel threads, forming nodules on the cross-points. The suture is impressed. The body whorl is ventrose. The subovate aperture measures half the length of the shell. The columella is slightly twisted at its base. The open siphonal canal is very short. The outer lip is rounded, very convex, incrassate inwards and ending in a V-shape sinus at its top.

Distribution
The holotype of this marine species was found off Tunisia.

References

 Gofas, S.; Le Renard, J.; Bouchet, P. (2001). Mollusca. in: Costello, M.J. et al. (eds), European Register of Marine Species: a check-list of the marine species in Europe and a bibliography of guides to their identification. Patrimoines Naturels. 50: 180-213
 Giannuzzi-Savelli R., Pusateri F. & Bartolini S. (2018). A revision of the Mediterranean Raphitomidae (Gastropoda: Conoidea) 5: loss of planktotrophy and pairs of species, with the description of four new species. Bollettino Malacologico. 54, supplement 11: 1-77

External links
 Pallary P. (1904-1906). Addition à la faune malacologique du Golfe de Gabès. Journal de Conchyliologie. 52: 212-248, pl. 7 [1904; 54: 77-124, pl. 4]
 

bracteata
Gastropods described in 1904